Split Butte is a volcanic crater of the Quaternary age located in Fermont county in Idaho.

The National Park Service called Split Butte one of the most unique features of the Snake River Plain.

Name 
The name of the crater comes from gap in the upper tephra layers at the eastern side of the butte.

Geology 
Split Butte is also a maars and a tuff cone. At one point it had a lava lake.

The split, which is located on the east side is believed to be caused by wind erosion. The winds have also caused more pyroclastic debris to the east side. 

It is slightly surrounded by lava flows from the Wapi lava field the butte contains vitric ash that forms a ring.

References 

Pleistocene lava domes
Volcanoes of Idaho
Volcanoes of the Rocky Mountains
Landforms of Butte County, Idaho
National Natural Landmarks in Idaho
Protected areas of Butte County, Idaho
Bureau of Land Management areas in Idaho